Rainer Sternal is a German swimmer who won three medals in freestyle relay events at the European championships in 1981 and 1983. During his career he won five national titles: in the individual 200 m medley (1985, 1986),  freestyle relay (1984), and  medley relay (1982, 1986).

References

Living people
German male swimmers
German male freestyle swimmers
Male medley swimmers
European Aquatics Championships medalists in swimming
Year of birth missing (living people)
20th-century German people